Charles Edward Johnson (29 April 1884–1954) was an English footballer who played in the Football League for Sheffield United and South Shields.

References

1884 births
1954 deaths
English footballers
Association football defenders
English Football League players
Wallsend F.C. players
Willington Athletic F.C. players
Sheffield United F.C. players
Gateshead A.F.C. players